Clonakilty Cowboys is the first album by the English-Irish folk rock band The Noel Redding Band. Released in 1975, the album is named after Clonakilty, from where the band was formed.

Reception

In a review for the music website allmusic, critic William Ruhlmann described the album as "very much a British rock album of its time", going on to say that it "didn't make any noise on the charts and it didn't deserve to".

Track listing

Personnel

The Noel Redding Band
Noel Redding – bass guitar, vocals, guitar arrangements
David Clarke – vocals, keyboards, piano, organ, clavinet
Eric Bell – guitar, vocals
Les Sampson – drums, percussion

Additional personnel
Robbie Walsh – guitar
Muff Winwood – production

References

1975 debut albums
The Noel Redding Band albums
Albums produced by Muff Winwood
RCA Records albums